The Boat may refer to:

 The Boat (1921 film), an American short comedy film
 The Boat (2018 film), a Maltese film
 The Boat (novel), a 1949 novel by L.P. Hartley
 "The Boat" (The Office), an episode of the American comedy television series The Office
 The Boat (short stories collection), a collection of short stories by Nam Le
 The Boats was an ancient method of execution also known as scaphism.
 A local name for the Tuxedo floating nightclubs
 A 2001 song by Electrelane, from the album Rock It to the Moon

See also
 Das Boot (disambiguation)
 Boat (disambiguation)
 The Ship (disambiguation)